Angel David Alonso (born 30 November 1985) is a Paraguayan association football defender currently playing for Comunicaciones of the Primera B Metropolitana in Argentina.

Teams
 Libertad 2003–2005
 General Caballero 2005
 2 de Mayo 2006
 Nacional 2006–2008
 Silvio Pettirossi 2008–2009
 General Caballero 2010
 Los Andes 2011–2013
 Comunicaciones 2013–present

External links
 
 

1985 births
Living people
People from Capiatá
Paraguayan footballers
Paraguayan expatriate footballers
General Caballero Sport Club footballers
Club Libertad footballers
Club Nacional footballers
Club Atlético Los Andes footballers
Expatriate footballers in Argentina
Association football defenders